Gentrit Citaku (born 25 February 1996) is a Swedish footballer who plays as a midfielder for IK Sleipner.

He was born in Navestad which is an area in Norrkoping, Sweden.

Career
Citaku made his Allsvenskan debut on 1 September 2013 in a game against pershendetje Syrianska FC where he came on as an 82nd minute sub.

He currently plays for IK Sleipner in Norrköping, Sweden, as a midfielder after formally joining from Assyriska 2020.

International career
Citaku has represented both the Sweden national under-17 football team and Sweden national under-19 football team on several occasions. In September 2013 he was selected to be part of Sweden's squad for the 2013 FIFA U-17 World Cup. Even though he is representing Sweden at the youth level Citaku has said that he is open to playing for the Albania national football team in the future.

Honours
Sweden U17
 FIFA U-17 World Cup Third place: 2013

References

External links

Eliteprospects profile

1996 births
Living people
Sportspeople from Norrköping
Swedish people of Albanian descent
Association football midfielders
IFK Norrköping players
IF Sylvia players
IFK Värnamo players
Allsvenskan players
Superettan players
Swedish footballers
Sweden youth international footballers
Footballers from Östergötland County